The Ecclesbourne Valley Railway is a   long heritage railway in Derbyshire.  The headquarters of the railway centre on Wirksworth station, and services operate in both directions between Wirksworth and Duffield and from Wirksworth to Ravenstor.

Passengers are able to board and alight heritage services at Duffield where a station platform (3) has been re-constructed. Heritage services are timed to connect with East Midlands Railway Nottingham – Derby – Matlock service at the adjacent Duffield Network Rail platforms and therefore it is now possible for passengers to travel to and from Wirksworth by train from anywhere on the national network.

The Ecclesbourne Valley Railway is named after the River Ecclesbourne and the track follows the river from its source to its confluence with the River Derwent at the Derbyshire village of Duffield.
 

The line is operated by a large fleet of heritage diesel multiple units (DMU), as well as diesel and visiting steam locomotives. Locomotive hauled trains initially only operated on enthusiast and special event days often alongside the DMU fleet, whereas now locomotive hauled services make up a larger part of the railway's timetable.

History

Origin
The "Wirksworth Branch" was the product of early 19th century railway rivalry.
It is for this reason that all of the bridges along the line, including the one which simply has a head shunt under it (Cemetery Lane) are built to double-tracked grand Midland Railway style.

Construction
The  line was surveyed in 1862 and received Parliamentary assent the following year. It would follow the valley of the River Ecclesbourne with no major obstacles apart from the final climb into Wirksworth. A cutting was required, and some buildings were demolished, while there was considerable upheaval in Duffield.

The final inspection of the line was carried out by Colonel J.A. Rich of the Royal Engineers on 26 September 1867, who approved the line for opening.

The line was opened to Wirksworth on 1 October 1867 and was initially worked by the Staff System.

However, when the lease expired on the original Ambergate line, the LNWR withdrew, and the Midland acquired complete control. Thus the section beyond Wirksworth was never built. The Midland was left with one of its few branch lines, and one which, it felt, was of questionable viability.

Operation
The presence of the line allowed Wirksworth's limestone business to develop, the carriage of which was its mainstay until the middle of the 20th century. There was also farm produce, particularly milk,  in 1906, and a number of textile mills (Wirksworth had the dubious distinction of being the main supplier of red tape for the London Government Departments).

There were three, rising to six, passenger trains from Derby each way, with one on Sunday, and two goods trains. By 1939, however milk was carried instead by road, and during World War II passenger travel was severely curtailed. There was also the hourly "number 37" bus, which led to a decline in passenger numbers. Passenger trains were temporarily suspended in 1947 and were officially ceased in 1949. An hourly (five on Sundays) direct bus (Trentbarton service 6.1) still operates (2014) between Wirksworth and Derby (Bus Station) with a journey time of 50minutes. However this runs via Belper rather than directly along the main road.

Rolling stock at various times included steam motor carriages from the Morecambe and Heysham Railway at the beginning of the century, and steam railmotors from the Yarmouth and North Norfolk Railway. In the early 1950s, people near the line were treated to the eerie sight of a railway carriage ghosting along, apparently by itselfthe test vehicle for the new diesel railcars being designed in Derbynothing more than a standard coach with the mechanism fitted and a windscreen cut in each end for the driver – that presaged a major change in British rail travel. When the so-called Derby Lightweights were produced they were each tested on the line after leaving the workshop. One of the only three surviving of those originally built, M79900, was converted from being the IRIS test car back to passenger carrying standard and has been joined recently by the other two, residing on the line on which they were originally tested some 60 years ago.

Rail accident 

Decline and closure
Although most of the goods had transferred to the roads, limestone traffic continued, including that formerly hauled by the Cromford and High Peak Railway, when it closed in 1967. Though the amount of traffic justified the installation of some continuous welded rail in the 1980s, production was increasingly of aggregate carried by road. In 1991 the quarries passed to Croxton and Garry Ltd (which later became Omya UK) which no longer needed a rail link. Although its sidings, and the station goods yard, at Wirksworth are still listed by Network Rail, the connection to the main line at Duffield has been severed and fenced off, There is hope that one day the EVR could "once possible funding would be made" purchase and re-use both the goods yard and the sidings for further/extra space for some rolling stock and train storage.

Present day

Preservation
In 1996 WyvernRail were awarded a Light Railway Order for the full length of the whole line.

On 8 March 2008, the railway began to branch its passenger operations further south by holding a grand opening ceremony for the line between Wirksworth station and Idridgehay station –  of the line's total length.

In 2003, WyvernRail agreed a 15-year lease-purchase deal with Network Rail. In May 2005, they completed the purchase early and bought almost the entire railway. The only portion still leased is an area of the station yard in Wirksworth which has been retained by Network Rail as a Strategic Rail Site and is on a rolling three-year lease to WyvernRail.

In July 2005, WyvernRail adopted Duffield railway station under a scheme promoted by the Friends of the Derwent Valley Line. They undertook to provide care and maintenance of the station on behalf of Central Trains who operated it at that time.

The line has now been brought up to passenger-carrying standards to allow trains to run through from Wirksworth to Duffield. At Duffield, passengers can change for mainline rail services by crossing from the branch platform (Platform 3) to one of the Network Rail platforms (either Platforms 1 or 2). Now that the line is open to Duffield it is the intention to revisit the larger Shottle site and refurbish the platform and surrounding areas (which needs considerable work). From 24 June 2012, a section of Shottle platform was reopened and it is now possible to alight there, although much work is still needed to complete this project. There may also be scope for reinstating the platform at Hazelwood but as of August 2015, there are currently no official plans.

Signalling and line operation
The railway principally operates on a token system, with the Wirksworth to Duffield section currently holding one token in the form of an Annett's key. The Wirksworth to Ravenstor incline holds a different Annett's key. Due to a ruling gradient on the line, the Wirksworth to Duffield section is protected by a trap-point just north of Wirksworth Station. The Wirksworth- Duffield line can now also be split in two sections with the installation of a passing loop at Shottle. This currently only happens on special events and bank holidays, as it requires two signalmen, one at each end of the loop, to be stationed for the day as there is currently no signal box to control movements in and out of the loop centrally. The former Oddingly crossing box is currently being restored for use as a signal box at Shottle. Two-train operation should be able to happen more regularly once it is finished.

An unusual piece of track work was installed at Wirksworth on platform 3. The track was interlaced (overlapping) either to allow the platform to be used for passenger trains or to allow wagons to collect stone from the adjacent dock. The interlaced section of track was operated by a manual tight point but still came under the control of the Wirksworth-to-Ravenstor train token. This feature has since been removed, however, as it was no longer required.

There were (and currently still are) very few physical signals on the line, apart from indications at cross-overs. One semaphore signal was located almost underneath Cemetery Lane Bridge, but this has recently been relocated to Shottle station as part of the signalling project for the passing loop. Another electronic signal was located at Duffield station to warn that it is the end of the line. It is believed that this signal was permanently lit for nearly forty years, before being swept away in the reconstruction of the platform ready for the reopening.

Film and TV appearances
The railway has seen various filming projects take place. The first filming venture came in the form of the Hellmann's Mayonnaise "Big Dollop" TV advert. The following year (2004) the railway was used again to film the National Geographic Channel's Seconds from Disaster where their ex-Gatwick Express coaches were used to depict the Eschede train disaster from 1998.

In 2006, a location just south of Wirksworth was used to film the ITV drama Mobile,
whilst in June 2007 Wirksworth was used as the fictional station of 'Lightbourne' in the BBC television series Casualty, season 22, episode 05. 
The storyline of Casualty involved both the Gatwick Express stock that is located on site as well as 03158 acting as an approaching goods train.

Stations
Stations of the Ecclesbourne Valley Railway, from north to south.

Rolling stock

Steam locomotives

Andrew Barclay 0-4-0T 2360 Brian Harrison (Ferrybridge No.3) built in 1954. – Undergoing a ten-yearly overhaul. Withdrawn in 2019, return to service anticipated for 2021. Boiler already back in frames after being overhauled by an external contractor.
Hudswell Clarke 0-6-0T No 102 (works number 1884 of 1955) Cathryn built in 1944 – Under Restoration Boiler reintegrated with the frames following restoration to working condition at an external contractor. Locomotive currently in the final stages of reassembly, anticipated to be completed in 2021.
 Bagnall Austerity 0-6-0ST 2746 The Duke built in 1944 – Under Overhaul. Carries bogus BR identity 68012.
 BR Standard Class 4 2-6-4T no. 80080 built in 1954 – Operational, boiler ticket expires in 2028. On loan from the Midland Railway – Butterley.

WyvernRail
WyvernRail Limited was established in 1992 as a community-owned and locally managed venture to restore and operate the Duffield to Wirksworth railway in Derbyshire, England.

The initial plan was to lease the line from Railfreight Construction (the British Rail sector then responsible for the line) and operate a community railway service between Wirksworth and Derby using leased diesel units, probably Class 142 'Pacers'.  The model used was termed 'Open Access', a method of operation used by some operators today (most notably Hull Trains and Grand Central).  The Railways Act 1993 created the framework that would allow WyvernRail to start the process, but the industry structure the Act created also caused the whole process to slow down to a crawl.

The line's saving grace was the designation of Wirksworth Station Yard as a Strategic Freight Site, which meant that the yard was protected for railway use, thus making closure of the line extremely difficult. Fortunately, the work was stopped by British Railways management as it was reported that there was the possibility of new stone traffic on the line. As a result, the line was mothballed and the strategic freight site designation meant that this status remains on the line to this day.

Changes to the structure of the industry following privatisation meant that for several years during the mid-1990s WyvernRail often experienced difficulty in maintaining a consistent relationship with the authorities responsible for the line.  However, while progress was slow on the ground, WyvernRail remained active wherever possible.  While the most significant achievement was the award of a Light Railway Order for the line in 1996, WyvernRail also investigated other projects.  During this period, the company's approach changed from Open Access to a straight lease or purchase of the line.
In 1997, the Derby and Wirksworth Railway Association was formed in response to growing interest in WyvernRail's activities.  The Association grew slowly over the next three years but, after renaming itself the Ecclesbourne Valley Railway Association in 2000, membership took off when access to the line was finally granted.

For WyvernRail, progress began at accelerate in the Summer of 2000, when Railtrack management not only took an interest in the firm's activities but provided a proactive and imaginative basis for negotiations, including granting the company's volunteers access to the line.  This approach led to the gradual restoration of the line, conversion to a plc and the successful share launch of WyvernRail plc in April 2002.

Reference and further reading

External links

 Ecclesbourne Valley Railway official website
 Ecclesbourne Valley Railway Association official website
 British Railways in 1960 – the Wirksworth branch
 British Railways in 1960 – the Wirksworth incline

Heritage railways in Derbyshire
Companies based in Derbyshire
Tourist attractions of the Peak District